Sir Philip Robert Barton  (born 18 August 1963) is a British diplomat, currently the Permanent Under-Secretary of the Foreign, Commonwealth and Development Office. He was previously British High Commissioner to India; he was High Commissioner to Pakistan from 2014 to 2016.

Early life and education
Barton was born on 18 August 1963. He studied economics and politics at Warwick University, graduating with a Bachelor of Arts (BA) degree, and economics at the London School of Economics, graduating with a Master of Science (MSc) degree.

Career
Barton joined the Foreign and Commonwealth Office (FCO) in 1986 and served at Caracas, New Delhi, at the FCO, and on secondment to the Cabinet Office and as a private secretary to the Prime Minister. He was deputy High Commissioner to Cyprus 2000–04; deputy Governor of Gibraltar 2005–08 (with a spell as acting Governor in 2006); Director, South Asia, at the FCO 2008–09; Director, Foreign Policy and Afghanistan, and Pakistan Co-ordinator at the Cabinet Office 2009–11; deputy head of mission at Washington, D.C. 2011–14; and was appointed High Commissioner to Pakistan from January 2014. Anti-tobacco movements in Pakistan and in the UK blamed Barton for his participation in a delegation led by British American Tobacco in 2015 to complain about the Pakistani government's decision to increase the size of health warnings on cigarette packs. "Inside sources at the Health Ministry confirmed the participation of the British High Commissioner in the meeting as a member of the delegation." He left Islamabad at the end of his assignment on 11 February 2016 and took up a post as Director General Consular & Security at the Foreign & Commonwealth Office in London, which he left in January 2020 to assume the role of High Commissioner to India, with the presentation of his credentials to the President of India on 8 July 2020. He was the shortest-serving High Commissioner to India on record. He departed this role and became the first Permanent Under-Secretary of State for the newly combined Foreign, Commonwealth & Development Affairs Office and thus Head of HM Diplomatic Service on 2 September 2020. He succeeded Sir Simon McDonald who had served since 2015.

In 2021 Sir Philip, apologised for the treatment of gay staff, “The ban was in place because there was a perception that LGBT people were more susceptible than their straight counterparts to blackmail and, therefore, that they posed a security risk. “Because of this misguided view, people’s careers were ended, cut short, or stopped before they could even begin. “And the diplomatic service undoubtedly deprived itself of some of the UK’s brightest and best talent. “I want to apologise publicly for the ban and the impact it had on our LGBT staff and their loved ones, both here in the UK and abroad.”

Honours
Barton was appointed Officer of the Order of the British Empire (OBE) in the 1997 Birthday Honours, Companion of the Order of St Michael and St George (CMG) in the 2007 Birthday Honours, and Knight Commander of the Order of St Michael and St George (KCMG) in the 2020 New Year Honours for services to British foreign policy.

Notelist

References

1963 births
Living people
Alumni of the University of Warwick
Alumni of the London School of Economics
Members of HM Diplomatic Service
High Commissioners of the United Kingdom to Pakistan
Companions of the Order of St Michael and St George
Officers of the Order of the British Empire
Permanent Under-Secretaries of State for Foreign Affairs
20th-century British diplomats
21st-century British diplomats